Jack Stevens is a professional rugby league footballer who plays as a  or  for the Salford Red Devils in the Betfred Super League.

In September 2022 Stevens made his Salford debut in the Super League against the Warrington Wolves.

References

External links
Salford Red Devils profile

2002 births
Living people
English rugby league players
Rugby league halfbacks
Salford Red Devils players